Brunovce is a village and municipality in Nové Mesto nad Váhom District in the Trenčín Region of western Slovakia.

History
In historical records the village was first mentioned in 1374.

Geography
The municipality lies at an altitude of 172 metres and covers an area of 5.821 km². It has a population of about 544 people.

Genealogical resources

The records for genealogical research are available at the state archive "Statny Archiv in Bratislava, Slovakia"

 Roman Catholic church records (births/marriages/deaths): 1700-1913 (parish B)
 Lutheran church records (births/marriages/deaths): 1871-1895 (parish B)

See also
 List of municipalities and towns in Slovakia

External links
https://web.archive.org/web/20071217080336/http://www.statistics.sk/mosmis/eng/run.html
Surnames of living people in Brunovce

Villages and municipalities in Nové Mesto nad Váhom District